The following are official state symbols of the Indian state of Karnataka.

References

External links

State symbols
Karnataka